Schaumburg is a station on Metra's Milwaukee District West Line in Schaumburg, Illinois. In Metra's zone-based fare system, Schaumburg is in zone F. As of 2018, Schaumburg is the 20th busiest of Metra's 236 non-downtown stations, with an average of 1,583 weekday boardings. The station is adjacent to Wintrust Field, home of the Schaumburg Boomers of the Frontier League.

As of December 12, 2022, Schaumburg is served by 42 trains (20 inbound, 22 outbound) on weekdays, by all 24 trains (12 in each direction) on Saturdays, and by all 18 trains (nine in each direction) on Sundays and holidays.

Gallery

References

External links 

Flickr Photo

Metra stations in Illinois
Railway stations in Cook County, Illinois
Railway stations in DuPage County, Illinois
Railway stations in the United States opened in 1989